Victor L. Martinez (February 21, 1954 – February 18, 2011) was an American poet and author. He won the 1996 U.S. National Book Award for Young People's Literature for his first novel, Parrot in the Oven: Mi Vida.

Life
Martinez was the born in Fresno, California to Mexican migrant agricultural field workers of the Central Valley. He was one of twelve children.  
Victor attended California State University at Fresno and later obtained a graduate degree from Stanford University on a Wallace Stegner Creative Writing Fellowship. He began writing as a poet and published a book of poetry, "Caring for a House," in 1992. He was a member of Humanizarte, a collective of Chicano poets, and later of the Chicano/Latino Writers' Center of San Francisco. 
He supported himself with jobs as a welder, truck driver, firefighter, teacher, and office clerk.  
In February 2011, he died of lung cancer at age 56 in San Francisco.

Parrot in the Oven

Martinez and his first novel Parrot in the Oven: Mi Vida won a National Book Award in 1996.

Parrot was a semi-autobiographical account of a 14-year-old Mexican American boy growing up "in a world of gangs, violence and poverty" in the projects of Central Valley (California).  
Martinez wrote the novel for adults but an editor suggested promoting it in the young adult fiction market.  
It has been translated into languages including Spanish, Italian, Japanese, and German, and widely acclaimed by young people around the world.

Works

Poetry
Caring for a House, Chusma House Publications, 1992,

Novels
El loro en el horno: mi vida, Noguer y Caralt, 2003,

Anthologies

References

External links

 

1954 births
2011 deaths
American children's writers
20th-century American poets
American writers of Mexican descent
National Book Award for Young People's Literature winners
Writers from Fresno, California
California State University, Fresno alumni
Stanford University alumni
Deaths from lung cancer in California
20th-century American novelists
21st-century American novelists
21st-century American poets
American male novelists
American male poets
20th-century American male writers
21st-century American male writers